The Kolombangara monarch (Symposiachrus browni), or Brown's monarch, is a species of bird in the family Monarchidae. It is endemic to Solomon Islands. Its natural habitat is subtropical or tropical moist lowland forests. It is threatened by habitat loss.

Taxonomy and systematics
This species was originally placed in the genus Monarcha until moved to Symposiachrus in 2009.

Subspecies
There are four subspecies recognized: 
 S. b. browni - (Ramsay, 1883): Found on Kolombangara, New Georgia, Vangunu and nearby islands
 S. b. ganongae - (Mayr, 1935): Originally described as a subspecies of the Solomons monarch. Found on Ranongga Island
 S. b. nigrotectus - (Hartert, 1908): Originally described as a subspecies of the Solomons monarch and subsequently as a separate species in the genus Monarcha. Found on Vella Lavella
 S. b. meeki - (Rothschild & Hartert, 1905): Found on Rendova and Tetepare Islands

References

Kolombangara monarch
Birds of Kolombangara
Kolombangara monarch
Taxonomy articles created by Polbot